Athrips huangshana is a moth of the family Gelechiidae. It is found in Anhui, China.

The wingspan is about 12 mm. The forewings are grey, with two indistinct diffused black spots in the cell. The hindwings are light grey. Adults are on wing in early August.

Etymology
The species name refers to Huangshan City, the type locality.

References

Moths described in 2009
Athrips
Moths of Asia